Players and pairs who neither have high enough rankings nor receive wild cards may participate in a qualifying tournament held one week before the annual Wimbledon Tennis Championships.

Seeds

  John-Laffnie de Jager /  Marcos Ondruska (qualified)
  Matt Lucena /  Bent-Ove Pedersen (second round)
  Mauro Menezes /  Fernando Roese (first round)
  Henrik Holm /  Peter Nyborg (qualified)
  Nicolás Pereira /  Roger Smith (second round)
  Gilad Bloom /  Mihnea-Ion Năstase (qualifying competition)
  Mike Bauer /  Brian Joelson (qualified)
  Lan Bale /  Sander Groen (second round)
  Jamie Morgan /  Roger Rasheed (first round)
  Roberto Saad /  Mario Tabares (first round)

Qualifiers

  John-Laffnie de Jager /  Marcos Ondruska
  Arnaud Boetsch /  Guillaume Raoux
  Doug Eisenman /  Mark Knowles
  Henrik Holm /  Peter Nyborg
  Mike Bauer /  Brian Joelson

Qualifying draw

First qualifier

Second qualifier

Third qualifier

Fourth qualifier

Fifth qualifier

External links

1992 Wimbledon Championships – Men's draws and results at the International Tennis Federation

Men's Doubles Qualifying
Wimbledon Championship by year – Men's doubles qualifying